The 2012–13 Austrian Football Bundesliga was the 101st season of top-tier football in Austria. The season began on 21 July 2012 and ended on 26 May 2013, with the winter break held between 22 December 2012 and 9 February 2013.

Teams

Stadia and locations

League table

Results
All club will play four times against each other, twice home and twice away, for a total of 36 matches.

First half of season

Second half of season

Season statistics

Top scorers

Hat-tricks

References

External links
  
  League321.com – Austrian football league tables, records & statistics database.

Austrian Football Bundesliga seasons
Austria
1